Moon Byung-woo (born 3 May 1986) is a South Korean football player who currently plays for Daejeon Korail FC.

On 18 November 2008, he was one of sixteen priority members to join Gangwon FC. He made his debut for Gangwon against Daegu FC as a substitute on 8 April 2009 in a league cup match. From the 2010 season, he joined Korea National League side Incheon Korail and returned to Gangwon for the 2013 season. In the 2014 season, Woo transferred to Daejeon Korail FC.

Club career statistics

References

External links

1986 births
Living people
South Korean footballers
Gangwon FC players
Daejeon Korail FC players
K League 1 players
Korea National League players
Myongji University alumni
Association football midfielders